Cotyloplana is a genus of land planarians in the tribe Rhynchodemini.

Description 
The genus Cotyloplana is characterized by a flat body with a wide creeping sole. There is one sucker located ventrally at the anterior end, in front of the creeping sole. The copulatory apparatus has a large spacious male atrium, with a small and obtuse penis papilla. A diverticulum opens into the common atrium from its posterior wall.

Species 
The genus Cotyloplana currently contains two species:
 Cotyloplana borneensis de Beauchamp, 1933
 Cotyloplana pilcata Whitehouse, 1914
 Cotyloplana punctata Spencer, 1892

References 

Geoplanidae
Rhabditophora genera